The red-collared woodpecker (Picus rabieri) is a species of bird in the family Picidae. It is found in Cambodia, China, Laos, and Vietnam.

Its natural habitat is temperate forests. It is threatened by habitat loss.

References

red-collared woodpecker
Birds of Laos
Birds of Vietnam
red-collared woodpecker
Taxonomy articles created by Polbot
Taxobox binomials not recognized by IUCN